Ministry of Justice of Denmark is the Danish government ministry responsible for the general judicial system, including the police and the prosecution service, the courts of law, and prisons and the probation service. In addition, the Ministry is responsible for legislation in the areas of criminal, private and family law, the law of trusts and foundations, nationality law and data protection law. The Ministry of Justice of Denmark might oversee the administration of justice in Greenland.

Councils, boards, commissions

Agencies
 Director for Public Prosecution
 Danish Court Administration
 Danish Prison and Probation Service
 Danish Civil Affairs Agency
 Danish Data Protection Agency
Danish Critical Supply Agency

Councils
 Det Dyreetiske Råd (the Council for Animal Ethics)
 Det Særlige Råd vedr. Dyreværnsspørgsmål (the Special Council for Animal Protection Issues)
 Rådet for Dyreforsøg/Dyreforsøgstilsynet (the Council for Animal Testing/The Supervisory Authority on Animal Testing)
 Retslægerådet (the Forensic Medicine Council)
 Datarådet (the Data Council)
 Det Kriminalpræventive Råd (the Crime Prevention Council)
 Dommerudnævnelsesrådet (the Judicial Appointment Council)
 Færdselssikkerhedskommissionen (the Road Safety Commission)
 Rådet for Sikker Trafik (the Council for Safe Road Traffic)
 Rådet vedrørende Hold af Særlige Dyr (the Council Regarding the Possession of Certain Animals)
 Tilsynsrådet vedr. Beskæftigelse af Indsatte (the Supervisory Council for the Occupation of Inmates)

Boards
 Advokatnævnet (the Disciplinary Board of the Bar and Law Society)
 Erstatningsnævnet (Criminal Injuries Compensation Board)
 Det Færøske Erstatningsnævn for Voldsofre (the Faroese Damages Board for Victims of Assault)
 Det Grønlandske Erstatningsnævn for Voldsofre (the Greenlandic Damages Board for Victims of Assault)
 Politiklagenævnene (Independent Police Complaints Authority)
 Pressenævnet (the Press Board)
 Procesbevillingsnævnet (the Appeals Permission Board)

Legal commissions
 Advokatudvalget
 Arbejdsgruppen om hold af heste
 Arbejdsgruppen om reglerne for udførsel af våben mv.
 Arbejdsgruppen om slagtefjerkræ
 Arvelovsudvalget
 Jurisdiktionsudvalget
 Konkursrådet
 Offentlighedskommissionen
 Retsplejerådet
 Straffelovrådet
 Strafferetsplejeudvalget
 Tinglysningsudvalget
 Udvalget om elektronisk Lovtidende
 Udvalget om offentligt ansattes ytringsfrihed og meddeleret
 Udvalget om retsvirkningerne af digital signatur mv.
 Udvalget om sanktionsfastsættelse i sager om spiritus- og promille-kørsel mv.
 Udvalget om TV-overvågning
 Udvalget vedrørende Politiets og Forsvarets Efterretningstjenester

Other commissions
 Justitsministeriets Forskningspolitiske Udvalg
 Kursusudvalget vedr. obligatorisk efteruddannelse af advokat-fuldmægtige
 Wamberg-udvalget

Committee
 Bestyrelsen for Domstolsstyrelsen

Inspections
 Danish Data Protection Agency
 Dyreforsøgstilsynet
 Statens Våbenkontrol

List of ministers
See List of Justice Ministers in Denmark

See also

Justice ministry
 Justitsministre fra Danmark (Ministers of Justice from Denmark)
Politics of Denmark

References

External links
 Justitsministeriet Danish Ministry of Justice, official website. Retrieved March 12, 2011 

Justice
Law of Denmark
Denmark